Lev Grigoryevich Potapov (born 28 October 1992) is a Russian football defender. He plays for FC Dynamo Vologda

Club career
He made his debut in the Russian Second Division for FC Spartak Yoshkar-Ola on 21 July 2012 in a game against FC KAMAZ Naberezhnye Chelny.

He made his Russian Football National League debut for FC Neftekhimik Nizhnekamsk on 7 July 2019 in a game against FC Mordovia Saransk.

References

External links
 

1992 births
People from Yoshkar-Ola
Sportspeople from Mari El
Living people
Russian footballers
Association football defenders
FC Neftekhimik Nizhnekamsk players
FC Zenit-Izhevsk players
FC Volga Ulyanovsk players
FC KAMAZ Naberezhnye Chelny players
FC Znamya Truda Orekhovo-Zuyevo players
FC Dynamo Vologda players
Russian First League players
Russian Second League players